The following are the telephone codes in Guinea.

Calling formats
To call in Guinea, the following format is used:

xxx xxxx Calls within an area code

y xxx xxxx Calls inside Guinea in city centers

+224 y xxx xxxx Calls outside Guinea

List of area codes in Guinea

See also 
 Telecommunications in Guinea

References

 ITU allocation data

Guinea
Telecommunications in Guinea
Telephone numbers